Lissan is a civil and Anglican and Roman Catholic ecclesiastical parish that spans parts of County Londonderry and County Tyrone, Northern Ireland. The local Roman Catholic church was built in 1908.

Sport
Lissan GAC is the local Gaelic Athletic Association club.

See also
List of civil parishes of County Londonderry
List of civil parishes of County Tyrone

References

 
Mid-Ulster District